John Douglass may refer to:

John Douglass (bishop) (1743–1812), English Catholic vicar-apostolic
John J. Douglass (1873–1939), U.S. Representative
John Thomas Douglass (1847–1886), American composer and violinist
John W. Douglass (born 1941), American military officer and politician
John W. Douglass (politician), Maryland politician
John W. Douglass (IRS Commissioner)
John Watkinson Douglass (1827–1909), American politician
Jack Douglass (John Patrick Douglass, born 1988), internet personality

See also
John Douglas (disambiguation)
Jonathon Douglass, Christian musician